Redick is a surname. Notable people with the surname include:

Cornelius Redick (born 1964), American football player
David Redick (died 1805), American surveyor, lawyer, and politician
Hazel Redick-Smith (born 1926), South African tennis player
JJ Redick (born 1984), American basketball player
John I. Redick (1828–1906), American lawyer, judge, and banker
Robert V.S. Redick (born 1967), American author

See also
Reddick (surname)